Avaray is a commune in the Loir-et-Cher department in central France.

History
Avaray is a French territorial title belonging to a family some of whose members have been conspicuous in history. The Béarnaise family named Besiade moved into the province of Orléanais in the 17th century, and there acquired the estate of Avaray. In 1667 Theophile de Besiade, marquis d'Avaray, obtained the office of grand bailiff of Orleans, which was held by several of his descendants after him.

Claude Antoine de Besiade, marquis d'Avaray, was deputy for the bailliage of Orleans in the states-general of 1789, and proposed a Declaration of the Duties of Man as a pendant to the Declaration of the Rights of Man and of the Citizen; he subsequently became a lieutenant-general in 1814, a peer of France in 1815, and duc d'Avaray in 1818. Antoine Louis Francois de Besiade, comte d'Avaray, son of the above, distinguished himself during the Revolution by his devotion to the comte de Provence, afterwards Louis XVIII, whose emigration he assisted. Having nominally become king in 1799, that prince created the estate of Ile-Jourdain a duchy, under the title of Avaray, in favour of the comte d'Avaray, whom he termed his "liberator".

Population

Sights
The Château d'Avaray was built in the 16th century; of this building only four corner towers remain. In the 1730s a central building with two curving wings was erected. The park is magnificent and is said to have been designed by Le Nôtre.

See also
Communes of the Loir-et-Cher department

References

Attribution

Communes of Loir-et-Cher